Petros Fyssoun (5 October 1933 – 5 December 2016) was a Greek actor in film and television.

Biography
Petros Fyssoun was born in Agrinio, Greece, his father was a Russian émigré, who was established in Greece after the Russian Revolution. He graduated from the Dramatic School of Art Theatre in 1954. Until 1956, he collaborated with the Art Theatre of Karolos Koun. From 1961 to 1965, he played lead roles for the National Theatre of Greece, and the same again in 1976-78 for the State Theatre of Northern Greece. His repertoire has included all kinds of theatre, from drama, comedy and tragedy to burlesque.

He took part in the 1965 Cannes Film Festival and the 1966 Moscow and Leningrad festivals, as well as in several festivals in Greece, including the Epidaurus Theatre Festivals.

He resided in Athens, and spoke English, Russian and Swedish.

Filmography
{| class="wikitable"
|-
! Year
! Title
! Role
! Notes
|-
|1958|| Oi paranomoi || Petros ||
|-
|1958|| Mia laterna, mia zoi || ||
|-
|1962|| Oi yperifanoi || Panagis Notaras ||
|-
|1962|| Amartoles || ||
|-
|1963|| O adelfos Anna || Andreas ||
|-
|1963|| Osa kryvei i nyhta || ||
|-
|1964|| Treason || Lieutenant Carl von Stein ||
|-
|1964|| Diogmos || Osen ||
|-
|1965|| I moira tou athoou || Lefteris ||
|-
|1965|| Dihasmos || Constantis ||
|-
|1966|| Epiheirisis 'Doureios Ippos''' || ||
|-
|1966|| O zestos minas Avgoustos || Kostas Makris ||
|-
|1966|| Oi enohoi || Father Grigoris ||
|-
|1967|| Afti i gi einai diki mas || Konstadis ||
|-
|1968|| O alygistos || Nikos ||
|-
|1968|| Brosta stin aghoni || Tilemahos ||
|-
|1969|| I orgi tou adikimenou || Dimitris Verenikos ||
|-
|1970|| Oi gennaioi tou Vorra || Vasilis Anthimos ||
|-
|1971|| Manto Mavrogenous || Dimitrios Ypsilantis ||
|-
|1972|| Aera! Aera! Aera! || Symeon ||
|-
|1980|| O anthropos me to garyfallo || ||
|-
|1983|| Horis martyres || Dr. Stefanos Sofos ||
|-
|1986|| Mpravo kolonelo || ||
|-
|1989|| Dexiotera tis dexias || ||
|-
|1998|| Eternity and a Day || Narrator || Voice
|-
|2011|| The Flight of the Swan || President of USA || (final film role)
|}

ReferencesWho's Who'' 1979, p. 73.

External links

1933 births
2016 deaths
Greek male actors
People from Agrinio